Clinton Smith may refer to:

 Clinton Smith (architect) (1846–1905), American architect
 Clinton Smith (basketball) (born 1964), basketball player
 Ron Clinton Smith (born 1951), actor